President Roxas, officially the Municipality of President Roxas,  is a 4th class municipality in the province of Capiz, Philippines. According to the 2020 census, it has a population of 31,269 people.

History
In 1949, the sitios and barrios of Aranguel, Culilang, Pandan, Pinamihagan, Cadoulan, Quiajo, Sangcal, Pondol, Marita, Madulano, Jabuyana, Bo-ac, Cabugcabug, Goce Badiangon, Bayuyan, Agbobolo, Cubay, Ibaca, and the sitio of Lotudlotud (Lutod-lutod), which was converted into a barrio of Elizalde, was separated from Pilar and formed into the separate town of President Roxas by virtue of Republic Act No. 374.

In 1952, barrio of Agbobolo was renamed Manoling.

Geography

Barangays
President Roxas is politically subdivided into 22 barangays.

Climate

Demographics

In the 2020 census, the population of Pres.

Economy

See also
 List of renamed cities and municipalities in the Philippines

References

External links
 [ Philippine Standard Geographic Code]
Philippine Census Information

Municipalities of Capiz